The 1930 Maryland Aggies football team was an American football team that represented the University of Maryland in the Southern Conference (SoCon) during the 1930 college football season. In their 20th season under head coach Curley Byrd, the Aggies compiled a 7–5 record (4–2 against SoCon opponents), finished sixth place in the SoCon, and outscored their opponents by a total of 231 to 142.

Schedule

References

Maryland
Maryland Terrapins football seasons
Maryland Aggies football